Hjalmar Karl Emil Dahl (15 May 1891 – 19 October 1960) was a Finnish-Swedish journalist, translator and author.

Biography
Hjalmar Dahl was born in Parikkala to pharmacist Johan Dahl (1861–1908) and Betty Kiljander (1865–1927). After graduating in Helsinki in 1910, he moved to the University of Lausanne, where he graduated in 1913. After returning to Finland, he began his almost 30-year career as a journalist in the Russian-language department of Hufvudstadsbladet, in addition to which he was editor-in-chief of Nya Tidningen from 1922 to 1925. He was also the editor-in-chief of Helsingfors-Journalen from 1929 to 1944, the editor of Månads-Revyn from 1940 to 1944 and the editor-in-chief of Aftonposten from 1944 to 1945.

As a writer, Dahl translated many Russian literary classics as well as works by F. E. Sillanpää into Swedish.

From 1955, Dahl lived in Porvoo, where he died on October 19, 1960. He was buried in Näsinmäki Cemetery.

Bibliography
 Erik Åmarks oro. Schildts, 1931
 Uppbrott. Schildts, 1932
 Herrarna till Kaukola. Schildts, 1941
 Store dvärgen. Schildts, 1946
 Helsingfors – det havsomflutna. Schildts, 1949
 Finlands svenskar : upplagsverk. Söderström, 1956

References

1891 births
1960 deaths
Finnish journalists
Finnish translators
Finnish writers in Swedish
People from Parikkala